Across the Hall is a 2009 American neo-noir horror film directed by Alex Merkin and starring Mike Vogel, Brittany Murphy, and Danny Pino. It is based on the 2005 short film of the same name and was Murphy's final film released during her lifetime.

Plot synopsis 

Convinced that his fiancee (Brittany Murphy) is cheating on him, a man (Danny Pino) follows her to a hotel and calls his best friend (Mike Vogel) to help him avoid a calamity.

Cast
 Mike Vogel as Julian
 Danny Pino as Terry
 Brittany Murphy as June
 Natalie Smyka as Anna
 Brad Greenquist as The Porter

Critical response 
The film has been praised by its stylish manufacture and outstanding performance by the main actors. The contrast between the emotions experienced by the main characters against the background of the rundown hotel and the formality of the porter has been pointed out as a great plot device. Nevertheless, some critics believe that the expansion of the short feature into a longer film was not entirely successful.

References

External links 
 
 

2009 films
2009 thriller films
American neo-noir films
American nonlinear narrative films
American thriller films
Features based on short films
Films set in hotels
2000s English-language films
2000s American films